Markus Schiegl (born 6 July 1975 in Kufstein) is an Austrian luger who has competed from 1987 to 2010. He won fourteen medals at the FIL World Luge Championships with five golds (Men's doubles: 1996, 1997; Mixed team: 1996,1997, 1999), five silvers (Men's doubles: 1999, 2003, 2007; Mixed team: 1993, 2008), and four bronzes (Men's doubles: 2001, 2008; Mixed team: 1995, 2000). Schiegl competes in doubles with his younger cousin Tobias.

Schiegl also won eight medals at the FIL European Luge Championships with two silvers (Men's doubles: 2002; Mixed team: 1996) and six bronzes (Men's doubles: 1998, 2000, 2010; Mixed team: 1994, 1998, 2002).

Competing in five Winter Olympics, his best finish in the men's doubles event was fourth twice (1998 and 2006).

Schiegl's best overall Luge World Cup finish was second in men's doubles (199394, 199899).

Since his retirement, Schiegl will concentrate on his career as a police officer.

References

Sources
 
 Hickok sports information on World champions in luge and skeleton.
 List of European luge champions 
 List of men's doubles luge World Cup champions since 1978.
 Schiegl/Schiegl erklären Rücktritt at the Fédération Internationale de Luge de Course (12 October 2010 article accessed 19 October 2010.)

External links
 

1968 births
Living people
Austrian male lugers
Olympic lugers of Austria
Lugers at the 1994 Winter Olympics
Lugers at the 1998 Winter Olympics
Lugers at the 2002 Winter Olympics
Lugers at the 2006 Winter Olympics
Lugers at the 2010 Winter Olympics
People from Kufstein
Sportspeople from Tyrol (state)